The Roman Catholic Diocese of Nebbi is a diocese located in the city of Nebbi in the Ecclesiastical province of Gulu in Uganda.

History
 12 July 1968: Established as Diocese of Lira from Diocese of Gulu

Nebbi was created in 1996 from the Diocese of Arua in northwestern Uganda, popularly known as West Nile.

Leadership
 John Baptist Odama (1996.02.23 – 1999.01.02), appointed Archbishop of Gulu Archdiocese
 Martin Luluga (1999.01.02 – 2011.04.30)
 Sanctus Lino Wanok (2011.04.30 – 2018.11.23), appointed Bishop of Lira
 Raphael p'Mony Wokorach, M.C.C.I. (2021.03.31 – ...)

See also
 Roman Catholicism in Uganda
 Nebbi

References

External links
 GCatholic.org
 Catholic Hierarchy

Roman Catholic dioceses in Uganda
Christian organizations established in 1968
Roman Catholic dioceses and prelatures established in the 20th century
Nebbi District
1968 establishments in Uganda
 
Roman Catholic Ecclesiastical Province of Gulu